Oscar Alejandro Limia Rodríguez (born 16 July 1975 in Avellaneda, Buenos Aires, Argentina) is a retired Argentine footballer. His career began in 1997 and ended in 2015.

Career 
He began his career as a professional goalkeeper in 1997 playing for Lanús, but he has spent most of his career in Argentina playing for Arsenal de Sarandí, whose fans still hold him in high esteem. In February 2009 he was signed by Colombian side América de Cali. In January 2010, however, he returned to Argentina to play for Unión de Santa Fe. His last team was Arsenal de Sarandí.

References

External links
 
 Statistics at Guardian Stats Centre
 Limia profile at cadistas1910.com 
 

Living people
1975 births
Argentine footballers
Argentine people of Spanish descent
Arsenal de Sarandí footballers
Club Atlético Huracán footballers
Club Atlético Lanús footballers
Unión de Santa Fe footballers
La Liga players
Cádiz CF players
CD Badajoz players
Footballers from Buenos Aires
Association football goalkeepers
Categoría Primera A players
América de Cali footballers
Argentine Primera División players
Argentine expatriate footballers
Argentine expatriate sportspeople in Spain
Expatriate footballers in Colombia
Argentine expatriate sportspeople in Colombia
Expatriate footballers in Spain